The National Indigenous Music Awards 2016 are the 13th annual National Indigenous Music Awards.

The nominations were announced on 31 July 2016 and the awards ceremony was held on 6 August 2016.

The theme for this year's award was Protest Songs. The year, celebrated the 50th anniversary of the Wave Hill walk-off the 40th anniversary of the Aboriginal Land Rights Act 1976 and 25 years since the release of Yothu Yindi's Tribal Voice.

Performers
A.B. Original
Shellie Morris
Warren H. Williams and Danielle Young
Kahl Wallis
Lonely Boys
Stanley Gaykamangu
Yirrmal with his father Witiyana Marika (of Yothu Yindi)
Rayella
Chris Tamwoy
David Spry
Kuren

Hall of Fame Inductee 
 Kutcha Edwards

Kutcha Edwards is an indigenous Australian singer and songwriter, born in Balranald, New South Wales in 1965. He is a member of the Stolen Generations, and was removed from his parents at the age of 18 months. He is a Mutti Mutti man. He was named Indigenous Person of the Year at the 2001 NAIDOC Awards. He has released four studio albums between 2001-2015.

Triple J Unearthed National Indigenous Winner
 Kuren

Kuren (aka Curtis Kennedy) is an 18 year old producer, of the Wiradjuri people. Kuren uploaded "Home" featuring Ben Alessi in May 2016 onto Triple J Unearthed and has collaborated with Allday, Sophie Lowe and Banks.

Awards
Artist of the Year

New Talent of the Year

Album of the Year

Film Clip of the Year

Song of the Year

Cover Art of the Year

Traditional Song of the Year

Community Clip of the Year

References

2016 in Australian music
2016 music awards
National Indigenous Music Awards